Monarch Lake is a reservoir in Grand County, Colorado located within the Arapaho National Recreation Area. The reservoir is adjacent to the Indian Peaks Wilderness on its north and east sides. The Continental Divide National Scenic Trail passes along its south side, and the trailhead at the west end of the lake also marks the beginnings or ends of several other popular hiking trails.

Dam
The dam (NID ID #CO00714) is an earthen dam that was completed in 1929. The United States Forest Service owns the dam, which is used for recreation and fishing. The primary inflow and outflow is Arapaho Creek.

References

External links
Arapaho National Recreation Area website

Lakes of Grand County, Colorado
Reservoirs in Colorado
Dams completed in 1929
Arapaho National Forest